Jamile Samuel (born 24 April 1992) is a Dutch athlete sprinter, who specialises in the 100 and 200 metres. She won three bronze medals at the 2010 World Junior Championships in Athletics, thus establishing herself as the third-fastest female runner under the age of 20 in the world. She won a gold medal with the Dutch women's 4 × 100 m relay team at the 2016 European Championships in Amsterdam.

Career

Jamile Samuel was born in Amsterdam in the Netherlands in a family with Surinamese roots. Her older brother Tjendo Samuel and younger sister Chanté also compete in athletics. She is a member of the Phanos athletics club based at the Olympic stadium in Amsterdam. She first came into the Dutch spotlight as a fifteen-year-old when challenging the record of four-time gold medalist at the 1948 Summer Olympics, Fanny Blankers-Koen. By the age of sixteen she was the 60 metres sprint champion in the Netherlands. She is the national champion in the 100 meters (2009 and 2017) and in the 200 meters (2011 and 2012).

At the 2010 World Junior Championships in Moncton (Canada), Jamile Samuel finished third in both the 100 meter and 200 meter sprints. With her teammates Dafne Schippers, Loreanne Kuhurima and Eva Lubbers she won a bronze in the 4x100 meters relay. One year later, at the 2011 European Athletics Junior Championships in Tallinn, Samuel finished behind British 100 and 200 meter sprints winner Jodie Williams, winning the silver medal in both cases.

At the 2012 European Athletics Championships in Helsinki (Finland), the Dutch 4x100 meters relay team (Kadene Vassell, Dafne Schippers, Eva Lubbers and  anchored by Jamile Samuel), were second in 42.80, a national record, behind the German team. She finished 6th in the 200 meters final. At the subsequent 2012 Summer Olympics in London (United Kingdom), the team finished 6th in the 4x100 meters relay final in 42.70, a new national record.

She finished 6th in the 200 meters at the 2014 European Athletics Championships in Zurich (Switzerland) that was won by Dafne Schippers. The 4x100 meters relay team, one of the favorites for the title, did not finish in the final due to a botched first baton change.

At the 2015 World Championships in Athletics in Beijing (China), the Dutch 4x100 meters relay team (Nadine Visser, Dafne Schippers, Naomi Sedney and Jamile Samuel as the anchor) finished 5th in 42.32, but was disqualified for a changeover infringement. In the heats the team had also run 42.32, a new national record.

She was the start runner of the Dutch women’s 4 × 100 m relay team led by Dafne Schippers, Tessa van Schagen and anchor runner Naomi Sedney that won the 4x100 meters relay at the European Championships in her home town Amsterdam with a national record of 42.04. She finished 4th in the 200 meters final in 22.83. She participated at the 2016 Summer Olympics in Rio de Janeiro (Brazil) where she was eliminated in the heats of the 200 meters. The relay team was also eliminated in the heats due to a botched relay handover between Samuel and Schippers.

Competition record

Personal bests

References

External links

1992 births
Living people
Dutch female sprinters
Athletes (track and field) at the 2012 Summer Olympics
Athletes (track and field) at the 2016 Summer Olympics
Olympic athletes of the Netherlands
Athletes from Amsterdam
Dutch sportspeople of Surinamese descent
European Athletics Championships medalists
World Athletics Championships athletes for the Netherlands
Olympic female sprinters